This is the discography of the alternative rock band Angels & Airwaves.

Studio albums

Compilation albums

Extended plays

DVD

Singles

Notes

Promos

Internet releases

Music videos and short films

Other appearances

Albums

Video games

References

Rock music group discographies
Discographies of American artists